Magnetic Group (former names: Magnetic MRO AS, Maersk Air Maintenance Estonia and Air Maintenance Estonia) is an aviation maintenance company headquartered in Tallinn, Estonia. The company offers a full range of commercial airplane maintenance services. It is certified by the European Aviation Safety Agency and the Federal Aviation Administration of the United States. The company operates worldwide. It is a subsidiary of Guangzhou Hangxin Aviation Technology.

History 
The company was established in 1995 as a maintenance department of Estonian Air.  In 2002, the maintenance department was separated from Estonian Air, and it became Maersk Air Maintenance Estonia, a company owned by Maersk Air. In 2003, the company was acquired by SAS Group. Accordingly, the company changed its name to Air Maintenance Estonia. In 2010, the company was bought by private equity and venture capital investor BaltCap. In 2014, the company was renamed Magnetic MRO. One year later the company established a sales and engineering office in London, United Kingdom. In 2016, Magnetic MRO acquired a United Kingdom-based aircraft interior company MAC Interiors (now known as Magnetic Creative). Also, in the same year, EngineStands24 was founded by Magnetic MRO. In 2017, the Estonian business promotion agency Enterprise Estonia selected Magnetic MRO as the Company of the Year and Exporter of the Year. In 2017, Magnetic MRO with Crestline Investors formed a joint venture Magnetic Parts Trading Limited,  to purchase aircraft and engines, parting them out and selling as individual components.

In 2018, Magnetic MRO was acquired by Guangzhou Hangxin Aviation Technology from BaltCap, a move consistent with Magnetic's desire to expand into the Chinese aviation market.  Since February 2019, bonds of Magnetic MRO with a redemption date in December 2021, have been traded on the Nasdaq Tallinn exchange as part of the MTF First North list.  Also in February 2019, MAC Interiors and Benniao Aviation created a joint venture MAC Sichuan to enter to the cabin redevelopment market in China.

In March 2019, Magnetic MRO has acquired Direct Maintenance, an Amsterdam-based independent MRO provider that is specialized in Line Maintenance for narrow- and wide-body aircraft. In early 2020, the launch of Magnetic Leasing, a company with a focus on long and short-term aviation asset management and leasing, was announced. Also, in March 2020, Magnetic MRO announced that the MAC Aero Interiors production facility has been moved to Tallinn, Estonia.

In early 2021, Magnetic MRO launched a new brand, Magnetic Engines, and opened a new workshop facility in Tallinn, Estonia. Later that year, Magnetic MRO integrated its Line Maintenance capabilities with its subsidiary, Direct Maintenance.

In 2021, Magnetic MRO was rebranded, Magnetic Group company was established, a new company structure was announced and a new brand mission was presented.

At the beginning of 2022, Magnetic Group announced the expansion and the opening of its new representative office in Miami, the USA.

References

Companies of Estonia
Aircraft maintenance companies
2002 establishments in Estonia